Nepal Food Corporation is the Government of Nepal agency to manage food market and import in Nepal. In 1974, agriculture purchase and sales corporation splitted into agriculture input corporation and nepal food corporation.

References

Foreign trade of Nepal
Government-owned companies of Nepal
Food and drink in Nepal